The British Consulate General Hong Kong (BCGHK), located at 1 Supreme Court Road, Admiralty, Hong Kong Island, is one of the largest British consulates general in the world and is bigger than many British embassies and high commissions. It is responsible for maintaining British ties with Hong Kong and Macau.

Together with the Consulate General of the United States of America, Hong Kong and Macau; the Consulate General of Malaysia; and the Consulate General of the Republic of Indonesia, the British consulate general is among the few consulates general in Hong Kong to be housed in its own building.

Role
Due to Hong Kong's status as a special administrative region of the People's Republic of China, the consul general in Hong Kong reports directly to the China Department of the Foreign, Commonwealth and Development Office, instead of to the British ambassador to Beijing, unlike consuls general in mainland China. The consulate general in Hong Kong also serves Macau, with several diplomats accredited specifically to Macau.

The consulate general was also the Regional Passport Processing Centre, handling passport applications from British citizens resident elsewhere in Asia. 

Previously, it also processed applications received by the British Trade and Cultural Office (now called the British Office) in Taipei, Taiwan. It also received registrations of marriages from British nationals in Taiwan, although there was no legal requirement for British nationals to do so.

This role ceased in 2014, and all passport-related matters have since been handled by His Majesty's Passport Office in the UK. Furthermore, visa application matters are outsourced to a separate company since 2015.

History
When Hong Kong was under British rule, the governor represented the British government, as well as the British monarch as head of state. Matters relating to British nationality were handled by the Hong Kong Immigration Department. 

During the negotiations between Britain and China on the future of Hong Kong, the British proposed the establishment of a "British commissioner" following transfer of sovereignty to China. Some of the diplomatic representatives of Commonwealth countries in Hong Kong were already known as "commissioners". This was rejected by the Chinese as an attempt to make the future Hong Kong Special Administrative Region into a member or associated member of the Commonwealth. 
 
However, the United Kingdom's commercial interests were represented by the British Trade Commission. The last senior trade commissioner (1993-1997), Francis Cornish, became the first British consul general following the transfer of sovereignty to China, on 1 July 1997.

The consulate general was designed by British architects Terry Farrell and Partners. Opened by Princess Anne on 30 January 1997, it was a HK$290 million project, with the British Council in an adjoining building opened in December that year.

The consul general has resided at rented flat at Opus Hong Kong since 2013.

List of HM consuls general
List of HM consuls general in Hong Kong:

See also
List of diplomatic missions of the United Kingdom
Consular missions in Hong Kong
Hong Kong Economic and Trade Office, London
Foreign Office and Colonial Office
Consulate General of Canada in Hong Kong and Macao
Consulate General of the United States, Hong Kong and Macau

References

External links

 

Government buildings completed in 1996
Hong Kong
United Kingdom
Hong Kong
Hong Kong and the Commonwealth of Nations